Chikkadpally is a village in the Rudrur mandal, Nizamabad district, Telangana, India, located near to Rudrur. Chikkapally is the one of the main villages in the Nizamabad district, with a population of 1500.

Transport
The TSRTC runs the Buses from Nizamabad to Rudur.

Villages in Nizamabad district